By administrative fiat, the Marinović cabinet established freedom of speech and the press, which was an important step in establishing parliamentary democracy. At the session of the Serbian Parliament held on November 27, 1873, the Marinović government presented a set of far-reaching reform laws, including the law on the subsidization of industrial enterprises and the law of six days of land ploughing (“day” meaning a Serbian land measurement equivalent to 5,760 m2), as a minimal privately owned landed property protected from being sold or repossessed due to debts. This allowed Serbian peasants who were small landowners, at the time often victims of property loss due to predatory lending, to have at least  of land (out of the total land which they owned) they could always count on as remaining in their possession. On December 23, 1873, his government instituted the law by which corporal punishment was abolished and the prison system reformed. Other reforms regarding secondary school and Great School were passed as well.

The Marinović government introduced the metric system into Serbia as well as a native silver currency. After losing the majority among Liberal deputies in Parliament in 1874, the Marinović cabinet became the first Serbian government to be toppled in the National Assembly, and called for new elections. After being defeated at the parliamentary elections in October 1874, Marinović resigned, and the new Cabinet of Aćim Čumić was established on December 7, 1874.

Cabinet members

See also
Principality of Serbia
Jovan Marinović

References

Cabinets of Serbia
Cabinets established in 1873
Cabinets disestablished in 1874